Pazik Kheyl (also Romanized as Pāzīk Kheyl) is a village in Talarpey Rural District, in the Central District of Simorgh County, Mazandaran Province, Iran. At the 2006 census, its population was 61, in 15 families.

References 

Populated places in Simorgh County